Chromohalobacter canadensis is a halotolerant bacterium from the genus of Chromohalobacter.

References

Oceanospirillales
Bacteria described in 1996